Roger Auguste Victor Abel (8 April 1900 – 27 June 1982) was a Monegasque sports shooter. He competed at the 1924, 1936, 1948 and 1952 Summer Olympics.

References

External links
 

1900 births
1982 deaths
Monegasque male sport shooters
Olympic shooters of Monaco
Shooters at the 1924 Summer Olympics
Shooters at the 1936 Summer Olympics
Shooters at the 1948 Summer Olympics
Shooters at the 1952 Summer Olympics